The Buffalo State Sports Arena is a multi-purpose sports complex, in Buffalo, New York, located at Buffalo State College, a campus of SUNY. The building contains an ice arena, sports arena, fitness center, the Houston Gym, Robert Kissinger Memorial Pool, and a varsity weight room. The sports arena seats 3,500, and is home to the Division III Buffalo State Bengals in the State University of New York Athletic Conference. The facility also houses a 1,800-seat ice arena that is home to the Buffalo State Bengals men's and women's ice hockey teams. It used to serve as host to Canisius Golden Griffins men's ice hockey which competes in Division I Atlantic Hockey until they moved to the LECOM Harborcenter in the fall of 2014 and the Buffalo Wings of Roller Hockey International. It also serves as the home for several youth hockey programs.

External links 
 Bengals Athletics
 

1991 establishments in New York (state)
Basketball venues in New York (state)
Buildings and structures in Buffalo, New York
College basketball venues in the United States
College ice hockey venues in the United States
Indoor arenas in New York (state)
Indoor ice hockey venues in New York (state)
Sports venues completed in 1991
Sports venues in Buffalo, New York